Park Ji-bin (born March 14, 1995) is a South Korean actor. He began his career as a child actor, notably in Hello, Brother (2005) and Boys Over Flowers (2009)

Personal life 
Park enlisted in the military on May 26, 2015 and was discharged on February 25, 2017.

Filmography

Film

Television series

Music video

Musical theatre

Awards and nominations

References

External links
 Official Website
 
 
 

1995 births
Living people
21st-century South Korean male actors
JYP Entertainment artists
Male actors from Seoul
South Korean male child actors
South Korean male film actors
South Korean male television actors
Actors from Seoul